This article provides a list of mathematical societies by country.

International mathematical societies
 African Mathematical Union
 Circolo Matematico di Palermo
 European Mathematical Society
 Foundations of Computational Mathematics
 International Linear Algebra Society
 International Mathematical Union
 International Association of Mathematical Physics
 International Society for Mathematical Sciences
 Mathematical Optimization Society
 Quaternion Society
 International Society for Analysis, its Applications and Computation 
 Society for Industrial and Applied Mathematics

Mathematical honor societies
Kappa Mu Epsilon
Mu Alpha Theta
Pi Mu Epsilon

National mathematical societies
Arranged as follows: Society name in English
(Society name in home-language;
Abbreviation if used)

American Mathematical Society
Australian Mathematical Society
Austrian Mathematical Society (Österreichische Mathematische Gesellschaft; ÖMG)
Bangladesh Mathematical Society
Brazilian Mathematical Society
Canadian Mathematical Society
Chinese Mathematical Society
Cyprus Mathematical Society
Danish Mathematical Society
Society of Mathematicians, Physicists and Astronomers of Slovenia (Društvo Matematikov Fizikov in Astronomov Slovenije, DMFA)
Gabon Mathematical Society
German Mathematical Society (Deutsche Mathematiker-Vereinigung; DMV)
Hellenic Mathematical Society (Ελληνική Μαθηματική Εταιρεία; EME)
Indian Mathematical Society
Institute of Mathematics and its Applications
Iranian Mathematical Society
Irish Mathematical Society
Israel Mathematical Union
Italian Mathematical Union
János Bolyai Mathematical Society
Kharkov Mathematical Society
Latvian Mathematical Society
Luxembourg Mathematical Society
Malta Mathematical Society
Mathematical Association
Mathematical Association of America
Mathematical Society of Japan
Mathematical Society of the Philippines
National Association of Mathematicians (US)
Nepal Mathematical Society
New Zealand Mathematical Society
Norwegian Mathematical Society
Norwegian Statistical Association
Pakistan Mathematical Society
Polish Mathematical Society
Portuguese Mathematical Society
Royal Spanish Mathematical Society (Real Sociedad Matemática Española)
Royal Dutch Mathematical Society
Royal Statistical Society
French Mathematical Society (Société Mathématique de France; SMF)
Society of Applied & Industrial Mathematicians
Society of Mathematicians, Physicists and Astronomers of Slovenia
South African Mathematical Society
Spanish Society of Statistics and Operations Research
Swiss Mathematical Society
Turkish Mathematical Society

List of regional mathematical societies 
Calcutta Mathematical Society or CalMathSoc (based in Kolkata, India)
Edinburgh Mathematical Society
Kerala Mathematical Association (based in Kerala State, India)
London Mathematical Society
Moscow Mathematical Society
St. Petersburg Mathematical Society
Trinity Mathematical Society (based in Trinity College, Cambridge)

See also

List of academic statistical associations

External links
MacTutor: List of Mathematical Societies
Member countries, associate members, and affiliate member societies of the International Mathematical Union
Mathematical societies – CIPMA

Mathematical societies